SDIF, "Sound Description Interchange Format" is a standard for the well-defined and extensible interchange of a variety of sound descriptions.  SDIF consists of a fixed framework plus a large and extensible collection of spectral description types, including time-domain (analogous to regular audio file formats), Sinusoidal Models, other spectral models, and higher-level models.  SDIF was jointly developed by IRCAM and CNMAT.

References
 Wright, M., A. Chaudhary, A. Freed, S. Khoury, and D. Wessel. 1999. “Audio Applications of the Sound Description Interchange Format Standard.” Audio Engineering Society 107th Convention, New York, preprint #5032.
 Schwarz, D. and M. Wright. 2000. “Extensions and Applications of the SDIF Sound Description Interchange Format.” Proceedings of the 2000 International Computer Music Conference, Berlin, Germany, pp. 481–484.
 Wright, M., J. Beauchamp, K. Fitz, X. Rodet, A. Röbel, X. Serra, and G. Wakefield. 2000. “Analysis/Synthesis Comparison,” Organised Sound, 5(3): 173-189.

External links
 SDIF project home page
 IRCAM's SDIF home page
 CNMAT's SDIF home page

Timbre